"Macushla" is the title of an Irish song that was copyrighted in 1910, with music by Dermot Macmurrough (Harold R. White) and lyrics by Josephine V. Rowe.  

The title is a transliteration of the Irish mo chuisle, meaning "my pulse" as used in the phrase a chuisle mo chroí, which means "pulse of my heart", and thus mo chuisle has come to mean "darling" or "sweetheart".

Utilisations in music
"Macushla" became the signature tune in the 1912 musical Macushla by Chauncey Olcott.

The song was recorded by a number of operatic tenors including John McCormack, James McCracken, Christian Ketter, Kenneth McKellar and Josef Locke.

Utilisations in movies
 1945: In Christmas in Connecticut, starring Barbara Stanwyck, the cow was called Macushla.
 1996: The song was used in the historical drama, Michael Collins.
 2004: In Million Dollar Baby, trainer Frankie has "Mo Chuisle" embroidered on the silks of boxer Maggie Fitzgerald (Hilary Swank) for her first overseas fight, and it is subsequently chanted by the various crowds in the film numerous times.

References

Irish songs